Francis Granger House is a historic home located at Canandaigua in Ontario County, New York. It is a two-story, five-bay center hall frame structure, in an extensively altered Federal style.  It was built in 1817 and was the home of nationally prominent Whig politician Francis Granger until 1827.

It was listed on the National Register of Historic Places in 1984.

References

Houses on the National Register of Historic Places in New York (state)
Federal architecture in New York (state)
Houses completed in 1817
Houses in Ontario County, New York
National Register of Historic Places in Ontario County, New York